Laliri George Maban (born 25 December 1954.) is a Ghanaian politician. He was the member of parliament for the Wulensi Constituency from 7 January 2013 to 6 January 2017.

Early life and education
Maban was born on 25 December 1954. He hails from Wulensi in the Northern Region of Ghana. He studied at EP Training College, Bimbilla where he obtained his Teachers' Certificate 'A' in 1979.

Career
Prior to entering politics, Maban was the District Co-ordinator of the Non-Formal Education Division (NFED) of the Ministry of Education in the Nanumba South District.

Politics
Maban entered parliament on 7 January 2013 on the ticket of the National Democratic Congress. He represented the Wulensi Constituency from 2013 to 2017 after losing the seat to Thomas Donkor Ogajah of the New Patriotic Party during the 2016 Ghanaian general election. He polled 11,061 votes as against Ogajah's 14,950 votes.

In parliament, he has served on various committees, including the Standing Orders Committee and the Works and Housing Committee.

Personal life
He is married with nine children. He identifies as a Christian and a member of the Catholic Church.

Employment 
 District Co-ordinating of NFED – Nanumba South District Wulensi
 Educationist

References

Ghanaian MPs 2013–2017
1954 births
Living people
Ghanaian Roman Catholics